Serikawa Dam is an earthfill dam located in Shiga prefecture in Japan. The dam is used for irrigation. The catchment area of the dam is 38.7 km2. The dam impounds about 14  ha of land when full and can store 1781 thousand cubic meters of water. The construction of the dam was completed in 1955.

References

Dams in Shiga Prefecture
1955 establishments in Japan